Elmira City School District is a school district in Elmira, New York. The district serves the city of Elmira and the towns of Ashland, Baldwin, Erin, Pine City, Southport, and Wellsburg (including the hamlet of Lowman).

It operates these schools below:
Fassett Elementary School
Thomas Beecher Elementary School
Hendy Elementary School
Pine City Elementary School 
Diven Elementary School
Riverside Elementary School
Broadway Elementary School
Coburn Elementary School
Broadway Academy
Ernie Davis Academy
Elmira High School

External links

Education in Chemung County, New York
Elmira, New York
School districts in New York (state)